Rico Rodriguez is the name of:
 Rico Rodriguez (musician) (1934–2015), Cuban born Jamaican trombonist
 Rico Rodriguez (actor) (born 1998), American actor
 Rico Rodriguez, the protagonist of Just Cause video games

See also 
 Ricco Rodriguez (born 1977), American martial artist